The Plan de Valparaíso is the name given to the flat part of Valparaíso, Chile, where public and commercial buildings are found, distinguishing it from the hills (cerros) where the majority of the population live.

Traditionally, the plan is divided into sectors Barrio Puerto, originally the nucleus of the city, and El Almendral, a preferentially dedicated trade zone.

References